Ilex walkeri is a species of plant in the family Aquifoliaceae. It is a large tree that is native to India and Sri Lanka.

References

 jstor.org

Flora of India (region)
Flora of Sri Lanka